MA Mobin is a Bangladeshi cinematographer and photographer. In 1977, he won the Bangladesh National Film Award for Best Cinematography for the film Simana Periye.

Selected films
 Dhire Bohe Meghna -  1973 
 Bichar - 1974
 Shimana Periye - 1977
 Janani - 1977
 Shurjokonna - 1977
 Lal Shobujer Pala - 1981
 Devdas - 1982
 Rajlakshmi Srikanta 1987
 Shonkhonil Karagar - 1992
 Dipu Number Two 1996
 Dukhai - 1997

Awards and nominations
National Film Awards

References

External links
 

Bangladeshi cinematographers
Best Cinematographer National Film Award (Bangladesh) winners
Bangladeshi photographers
2016 deaths